Statistics of Czechoslovak First League in the 1988–89 season. Milan Luhový was the league's top scorer with 25 goals.

Overview
It was contested by 16 teams, and Sparta Prague won the championship.

Stadia and locations

League standings

Results

Top goalscorers

References

Czechoslovakia - List of final tables (RSSSF)

Czechoslovak First League seasons
Czech
1988–89 in Czechoslovak football